Ulysses Simpson "Killer" McPherson Jr. was an American football coach and college athletics administrator. He was the second head football coach at Mississippi Vocational College—now known as Mississippi Valley State University—in Itta Bena, Mississippi, serving for four seasons, from 1954 to 1957, and compiling a record of 26–8–2	.  McPherson was the head football coach at Jackson State University from 1969 to 1970, where he accumulated a two-year record of 6–13.

McPherson was hired in 1971 as an assistant football coach at Alabama State University in Montgomery, Alabama. He was appointed the acting athletic director at Alabama State in February 1972.  He was later the athletic director at the University of Maryland Eastern Shore and oversaw the Summer Youth Sports Program in Princess Anne, Maryland.

Head coaching record

College

References

Year of birth missing
Year of death missing
Alabama State Hornets athletic directors
Alabama State Hornets football coaches
Arkansas–Pine Bluff Golden Lions football coaches
Jackson State Tigers football coaches
Maryland Eastern Shore Hawks athletic directors
Mississippi Valley State Delta Devils football coaches
Tennessee State Tigers football players
High school football coaches in Alabama
Indiana University alumni
Players of American football from Louisville, Kentucky
African-American coaches of American football
African-American players of American football
20th-century African-American sportspeople